Tazehabad (also Romanized as Tāzehābād) is a city and capital of Salas-e Babajani County, Kermanshah Province, Iran.  At the 2006 census, its population was 7,479, in 1,661 families.

The spoken language in the city is Kurdish, but the language which is used in schools and offices is Persian, as the official language of Iran in which almost everyone in the city is fluent.

References

Populated places in Salas-e Babajani County

Cities in Kermanshah Province